Suraiya Jatoi is a Pakistani politician who had been a member of the National Assembly of Pakistan, from March 2008 to May 2018.

Political career
She was elected at the National Assembly of Pakistan as a candidate of Pakistan Peoples Party on a seat reserved for women from Sindh in the 2008 Pakistani general election.

She was re-elected at the National Assembly of Pakistan as a candidate of Pakistan Peoples Party on reserved seats for women from Sindh in 2013 Pakistani general election.

References

Living people
Pakistan People's Party politicians
Sindhi people
Pakistani MNAs 2013–2018
People from Sindh
Pakistani MNAs 2008–2013
Women members of the National Assembly of Pakistan
Year of birth missing (living people)
21st-century Pakistani women politicians